The fifth and final season of Ghost Whisperer, an American television series created by John Gray, commenced airing in the United States on September 25, 2009, concluded May 21, 2010, and consisted of 22 episodes. The series follows the life of Melinda Gordon (Jennifer Love Hewitt), who has the ability to see and communicate with ghosts. While trying to live as normal a life as possible—she is married and owns an antique store—Melinda helps earthbound spirits resolve their problems and cross over into the Light, or the spirit world. Her tasks are difficult and at times she struggles with people who push her away and disbelieve her ability. In addition, the ghosts are mysterious and sometimes menacing in the beginning and Melinda must use the clues available to her to understand the spirit's needs and help them.

Ghost Whisperer'''s fifth and final season aired in the United States (U.S.) on Fridays at 8:00 pm ET on CBS, where it received an average of 7.78 million viewers per episode, becoming the least watched season of the series.

 Plot 
In the fifth season, five years have elapsed since the events of the previous season, and we are introduced to Jim and Melinda's son, Aiden Lucas. We learn that he can see the "Shinies and the Shadows", two opposing groups of ghosts that Melinda is unable to see. The Shadows are revealed to be the negative part of spirits that get left behind when they cross over, and their motives involve acquiring the Book of Changes. Melinda, Ned, and Eli, with the frequent help of Delia, work to keep the book safe from the Shadows. Throughout the season, Melinda struggles to keep Aiden safe and help him with his gift. He has frequent run-ins with the Shinies, who are presumed to be the kind group of spirits and are attracted to shiny objects. The Shadows show tremendous power throughout the season, forcing President Bedford, the president of Rockland University to blow up Delia's real estate office.

At the end of the series, Melinda and Jim try to protect Aiden by convincing him that ghosts don't exist (at the advice of Carl the Watcher, later revealed to be under the influence of the Shadows). The Shadows gradually begin to take possession of Melinda's body. Aiden is told by Carl that he must go to Melinda's store. Jim, Ned, Eli and Delia follow with him. Melinda is inside, being engulfed by the Shadows. Aiden, who has forged a friendship with one of the Shinies (previously revealed to be the ghosts of children), enlists their help. In the town square, dozens of Shinies gather, and emit a bright light. The Shinies and their light become visible to passersby in the square. Inside the store, the Shadows are trying to battle the light and fully possess Melinda, but fail on both accounts. Melinda drops to the ground and the group run in. Outside, in the residual light from the Shinies, we see the Shadows apparently being dispersed and presumable destroyed.  Later that night, Aiden is in his room and Melinda and Jim enter. Melinda tells him that they should both be proud of their gift and that he was her hero that night. Aiden replies that Melinda is a hero every day, and the series closes with a shot of Melinda smiling and tearing up.

 Development Ghost Whisperer is based on the work of "Spirit Communicator" James Van Praagh, who is co-executive producer and regularly updates a blog about the show through LivingTV. The stories are also said to be based in part on the work of "Spirit Communicator" Mary Ann Winkowski. Development of the show dates back to at least two years before its premiere.

The show was produced by Sander/Moses Productions in association with CBS Television Studios (originally Paramount Network Television in season one and ABC Studios (originally Touchstone Television in the first two seasons) and CBS Paramount Network Television in seasons two and three).

The show was filmed on the Universal Studios back lot in Los Angeles. One area on the lot is Courthouse Square from the Back to the Future trilogy, though it has been drastically modified to depict Grandview. For example, the clock tower in Back to the Future has been completely covered up. Cast and crew members believe that the set gets visits from real spirits.

Sound effects were completed at Smart Post Sound. Visual effects for the pilot and some season one episodes were completed at Flash Film Works. Visual effects for nearly the entire series were created at Eden FX.

Creator John Gray grew up in Brooklyn, New York, which is not far from Grandview-On-Hudson, west of the Hudson River. Piermont is often referenced in episodes as the neighboring town, which is accurate to real life as Grandview-On-Hudson is actually located just north of Piermont. Professor Rick Payne worked in the fictional "Rockland University", and perhaps not coincidentally, the actual Grandview, New York is a village located in Rockland County, New York.

 Syndication 
On May 5, 2008 it was announced that the first three seasons of Ghost Whisperer were purchased for $169.8 million ($700,000 per episode, per network) for syndication by SyFy, ION Television, and WE TV. Episodes began airing in Summer 2009 on ION, and in Fall 2009 on SyFy and WE. The first four seasons began airing in syndication on CBC Television in Canada on August 31, 2009.

 Cancellation 
On May 18, 2010, citing rising costs and a decline in viewership, CBS announced that Ghost Whisperer would not be renewed for another season. On May 18, 2010, CBS cancelled the show after five seasons. ABC expressed interest in picking up Ghost Whisperer for Fall 2010. It was revealed on May 19, that writers of the show were informed to not look for other jobs yet, and the producers were very optimistic that there was a good chance of Ghost Whisperer being renewed by ABC. On May 27, 2010, Michael Ausiello reported that ABC had passed on renewing Ghost Whisperer for its sixth season. 

In October 2010, Jennifer Love Hewitt thanked the fans of the show for their support in a goodbye video saying, "Your love and support has meant everything to the cast and crew of Ghost Whisperer'' and we will all miss you guys very, very much. Go get our DVDs, think about us, miss us and know how much we all will miss you. Much love." She was visibly emotional during the video and simply waved to the camera at the end of the video as she was unable to finish speaking.

Cast 

 Jennifer Love Hewitt as Melinda Gordon (22 episodes)
 David Conrad as Jim Clancy/Sam Lucas (22 episodes)
 Camryn Manheim as Delia Banks (18 episodes)
 Christoph Sanders as Ned Banks (14 episodes)
 Jamie Kennedy as Eli James (22 episodes)
 Connor Gibbs as Aiden Lucas (22 episodes)

Episodes

References 

General references 
 
 
 

2009 American television seasons
2010 American television seasons
5